Rabbi Yehuda Teichtal (born 1972 in Brooklyn, New York, USA), is an Orthodox rabbi in Berlin, Germany. He is Rabbi of the Jewish Community of Berlin and president of the Chabad Jewish Education Centre in Berlin, Germany.

Biography

Teichtal was born in New York and grew up in a Hasidic Jewish family. His great-grandfather Rabbi Yissachar Shlomo Teichtal was one of the few European rabbis to support an active effort to settle the land of Israel. After completing his studies in New York, Los Angeles, Morristown (USA), Melbourne (Australia) and Wellington (New Zealand), Yehuda Teichtal was ordained as a rabbi. In 1996 Yehuda Teichtal arrived in Berlin together with his wife Leah. As part of the Jewish community in Berlin, he founded a local Chabad branch. The largest Jewish education center in Europe was opened in 2007 under his direction in the western part of Berlin. The building was financed through contributions from community members.

Titles and recognition
Rabbi Teichtal graduated from high school in 1989 and then attended rabbinical college in Morristown, New Jersey. At age 23 he was ordained as a rabbi by Rabbi Zalman Goldberg - one of the senior judges in the High Court of the Israeli Chief Rabbinate. Later he was also ordained by Rabbi Avraham Yosef - the chief rabbi of Holon, the son of Rabbi Ovadia Yosef, Rabbi Yohanan Gurary and Rabbi Yehuda Jeruslavski - the secretary of the Chabad Rabbinical Court in Israel. In 2002 Rabbi Yehuda Teichtal was ordained by the chief rabbi of Israel Eliyahu Bakshi-Doron to be a community rabbi. Rabbi Yehuda Teichtal is also a member of the rabbinical court of Berlin Machzihei-Hadat, which is recognized by the chief rabbi of Israel as declared on 3 July 2014.

Yehuda Teichtal is the community rabbi of the Jewish Community in Berlin and the founder of the Pears Jüdischer Campus in Berlin, Germany.

Philosophy
Teichtal advocates a Jewish congregation that is open to all regardless of background and promotes readiness to spread Jewish knowledge.

Achievements
 1996 establishment of Chabad Lubawitsch Berlin
 1997 inauguration of the Chabad Center
 1998 establishment of the Jewish camp Gan Israel
 1999 establishment of the first rabbinical seminaries
 2000 establishment of the synagogue in Augsburger Strasse, Berlin
 2001 establishment of the first youth club, organizing the visit of the Chief Rabbi of Israel in Berlin
 2002 public Chanukah candle lighting ceremony at the Brandenburg Gate in Berlin in the presence of Berlin's Governing Mayor, Mr. Klaus Wowereit.
 2004 establishment of the Jewish Kindergarten Gan Israel in Berlin
 2005 establishment of the Jewish Traditional School, a government recognized elementary school.
 2006 establishment of the Jewish multimedia center and library
 2007 opening and inauguration of the Jewish Educational Center Berlin in the presence of Germany's foreign minister Steinmeier. This 6 million EURO building was the first Jewish center establishment in Germany after the Shoa, which was mainly funded through private sponsors. 
 2008 opening of the Mikvah Berlin – a Jewish ritual bath.
 2009 establishment of the Jewish boarding school Torah Kolleg, Berlin Jewish Torah Center
 2010 the first time since World War II, a Jewish Parade for peace and tolerance took place in Berlin, with over 30 Jewish and non-Jewish organizations participating and over 1000 participants.
 2011 establishment of the Center for Israelis in Berlin, and establishment of the first Jewish Traditional High School in Germany. 
 2012 establishment of the second Jewish Kindergarten in Berlin-Wilmersdorf
 2013 establishment of the first Jewish Student Center in Germany
 2018 founding Pears Jüdischer Campus - the first Jewish campus in Germany

Family
Rabbi Teichtal is married to Leah Teichtal and is the father of two sons and four daughters.

References

1972 births
People from Brooklyn
Living people
21st-century German rabbis
German Hasidic rabbis
Rabbis from Berlin
Chabad in Europe
Chabad-Lubavitch rabbis